Jang Si-hwan (born November 1, 1987) is a South Korean professional baseball pitcher for the Hanwha Eagles of the KBO League. He has also played for the Hyundai Unicorns, the Nexen Heroes, and the Lotte Giants.

On November 21, 2019, he and Kim Hyun-woo, who were then members of the Lotte Giants, and Kim Joo-hyun and Ji Sung-joon, who were members of the Hanwha Eagles, moved to a 2:2 trade.

References

External links
Career statistics and player information from Korea Baseball Organization

1987 births
Living people
South Korean baseball players
KBO League pitchers
Hyundai Unicorns players
Kiwoom Heroes players
KT Wiz players
Lotte Giants players
Sportspeople from South Chungcheong Province
2017 World Baseball Classic players